The Narayana Sukta or Narayana Suktam (IAST: Nārāyaṇa Sūktam) is a hymn propitiating the Supreme Deity-Narayana in Yajurveda. Some commentators see it as a mystical appendix to the Purusha Sukta. Narayana, in Hinduism, is considered as the Supreme Truth (Brahman), the thousand-headed, thousand-eyed, and thousand-limbed creator and this hymn is recited to worship Narayana, the universal Self (Paramatman) which is identified with the Brahma (the creator), Vishnu (the all pervading, beneath and beyond absolute - the preserver) and Shiva (the auspicious one - the destroyer), who are aspects of the Supreme Lord and not the different deities.lyrics of this suktam is as follows:

सहस्र शीर्षं देवं विश्वाक्षं विश्वशंभुवम् ।
विश्वै नारायणं देवं अक्षरं परमं पदम् ॥

विश्वतः परमान्नित्यं विश्वं नारायणं हरिम् ।
विश्वं एव इदं पुरुषः तद्विश्वं उपजीवति ॥

पतिं विश्वस्य आत्मा ईश्वरं शाश्वतं शिवमच्युतम् ।
नारायणं महाज्ञेयं विश्वात्मानं परायणम् ॥

नारायण परो ज्योतिरात्मा नारायणः परः ।
नारायण परं ब्रह्म तत्त्वं नारायणः परः ।
नारायण परो ध्याता ध्यानं नारायणः परः ॥

यच्च किंचित् जगत् सर्वं दृश्यते श्रूयतेऽपि वा ।
अंतर्बहिश्च तत्सर्वं व्याप्य नारायणः स्थितः ॥

अनन्तं अव्ययं कविं समुद्रेन्तं विश्वशंभुवम् ।
पद्म कोश प्रतीकाशं हृदयं च अपि अधोमुखम् ॥

अधो निष्ठ्या वितस्त्यान्ते नाभ्याम् उपरि तिष्ठति ।
ज्वालामालाकुलं भाती विश्वस्यायतनं महत् ॥

सन्ततं शिलाभिस्तु लम्बत्या कोशसन्निभम् ।
तस्यान्ते सुषिरं सूक्ष्मं तस्मिन् सर्वं प्रतिष्ठितम् ॥

तस्य मध्ये महानग्निः विश्वार्चिः विश्वतो मुखः ।
सोऽग्रविभजंतिष्ठन् आहारं अजरः कविः ॥

तिर्यगूर्ध्वमधश्शायी रश्मयः तस्य सन्तता ।
सन्तापयति स्वं देहमापादतलमास्तकः ।
तस्य मध्ये वह्निशिखा अणीयोर्ध्वा व्यवस्थिताः ॥

नीलतोयद-मध्यस्थ-द्विद्युल्लेखेव भास्वरा ।
नीवारशूकवत्तन्वी पीता भास्वत्यणूपमा ॥

तस्याः शिखाया मध्ये परमात्मा व्यवस्थितः ।
स ब्रह्म स शिवः स हरिः स इन्द्रः सोऽक्षरः परमः स्वराट् ॥

ऋतं सत्यं परं ब्रह्म पुरुषं कृष्ण पिङ्गलम् ।
ऊर्ध्वरेतं विरूपाक्षं विश्वरूपाय वै नमो नमः ॥

ॐ नारायणाय विद्महे वासुदेवाय धीमहि ।
तन्नो विष्णुः प्रचोदयात् ॥
ॐ शांति शांति शांतिः ॥

See also
 List of suktas and stutis

Notes

External links
Narayana Suktam, Translated by P. R. Ramachander
Material from http://www.srihayagrivan.org, proof read by Mannargudi SrI Srinivasan Narayanan of the Ahobilla Mutt
Material from http://www.sathyasaiottawa.org

Hindu texts
Sanskrit texts
Vedic hymns